"A Slow Song" is a song by British singer-songwriter and musician Joe Jackson, which was released in 1982 as the closing track on his fifth studio album Night and Day. The song was written by Jackson, and produced by Jackson and David Kershenbaum.

In 1983, "A Slow Song" was released as a single in the UK, becoming the fifth and final single to be taken from Night and Day. It was not a commercial success as a single, but received positive critical reception. The song has been Jackson's regular concert finisher since 1982.

Background
Jackson has described "A Slow Song" as a "romantic song". In his introduction of the song during a 1983 performance, Jackson said: "It's all about being with the one you love, that special person, late one night, winding down and just waiting for the right song to have a slow dance to. You remember when the DJ at the end of the evening used to play a slow song? They don't seem to do it anymore. So if you've been in this situation, you'll understand why I wrote this song."

Critical reception
In a contemporary review of "Night and Day", Jim Bohen of the Daily Record described "A Slow Song" as an "impassioned ballad" which contains an organ solo "as eloquent as the lyric". Paul Willistein of The Morning Call considered the song to be "an exquisite and powerful commentary on much of contemporary pop presented as re-working of the old saw 'Music has charms to soothe the savage beast'." Mike Daly of The Age described the song a "gently rocking plea for relief from high-energy music" and praised the "nice bridging organ" and chorus' "superb hook".

George Kanzler of the Newhouse News Service noted Jackson's vocal performance as being "delivered in a barely held-back heavy metal singer's tone, as if Robert Plant were trying to cover Dan Fogelberg". Brett Milano of The Boston Globe praised Jackson's vocal as being "his strongest on record" and noted the song's "dramatic buildup".

In 2015, Dave Lifton of Ultimate Classic Rock picked "A Slow Song" as his number one choice for a feature covering Joe Jackson's top ten songs. Lifton considered the song to "owe more than a nod" to "Unchained Melody" and noted the "gorgeously cathartic climax".

Track listing
7" single
"A Slow Song" - 7:13
"Real Men" - 4:05

Personnel
 Joe Jackson – vocals, keyboards
 Graham Maby – bass
 Larry Tolfree – drums
 Sue Hadjopoulos – percussion
 Ed Rynesdal – violin

Production
 Joe Jackson – producer, mixing
 David Kershenbaum – producer, mixing
 Michael Ewasko – engineer
 Ken Tracht - assistant engineer

Other
 Alan Ballard, Gary Green – photography

Charts

References

1982 songs
1983 singles
Joe Jackson (musician) songs
Songs written by Joe Jackson (musician)
Song recordings produced by David Kershenbaum
A&M Records singles